Baoda was a Chinese era name used by several emperors of China. It may refer to:

Baoda (寶大, 924–925), an era name used by Qian Liu, king of Wuyue
Baoda (保大, 943–957), an era name used by Li Jing (Southern Tang)
Baoda (保大, 1121–1125), an era name used by Emperor Tianzuo of Liao